born  was a Japanese singer.

Born Shigeko Kotakari in Yotsuya, Hayama attended Aoyama Gakuin Senior High School, where she was discovered while singing jazz. She debuted at the age of 18 in 1952, and two years later entered the Kohaku Uta Gassen for the first time. Hayama was known for singing the Japanese-language version of "Do-Re-Mi", a show tune from The Sound of Music later placed on the Nihon no Uta Hyakusen in 2007. She also lent her voice to Japanese dubs of Disney films and released a Japanese cover of "The Wedding" under its original title "La Novia". Hayama's  famous Japanese songs included "Having Left Tosa", "School Days", and "Shimabara Lullaby". Her last performance was held in March 2017, at a memorial concert for Fubuki Koshiji.

Hayama was honored by the Ministry of Education in 1993 for her contributions to fine arts in Japan. Two years later, she received the Medal with Purple Ribbon. In 2004, Hayama was awarded an Order of the Rising Sun, fourth class. She became the first chairwoman of the Japanese Singers Association in 2007, and served until 2010.

Hayama was married to Jun Negami from 1965 until his death in 2005. She died at the age of 83 in 2017, after being hospitalized in Tokyo due to pneumonia.

Kōhaku Uta Gassen Appearances

1966 didn't chosen as participating singer due to NHK policies to let emcees focus as emcee. (Same as 1967 to Yumiko Kokonoe)
1967 dismissed due to pregnancy.
1989 appeared as 4th singer in 7 singers of red team in 1st part, because this time's 1st part is not counted as duel, so singers in 1st part didn't versus with anybody. (4th singer in white team is The Tigers.)

References

External links

1933 births
2017 deaths
Singers from Tokyo
Deaths from pneumonia in Japan
Japanese women jazz singers
Recipients of the Order of the Rising Sun, 4th class
Recipients of the Medal with Purple Ribbon
Musicians from Shinjuku
20th-century Japanese women singers
20th-century Japanese singers
21st-century Japanese women singers
21st-century Japanese singers